Boubacar Diallo (born 25 December 1985) is a Guinean former professional footballer who played as a defender. Between 2008 and 2011 he made four appearances for the Guinea national team.

He joined Slovak Super Liga club Spartak Trnava in summer 2010.

References

1985 births
Living people
Association football defenders
Guinean footballers
Guinea international footballers
Guinean expatriate footballers
Championnat National 2 players
Slovak Super Liga players
Lebanese Premier League players
Gazélec Ajaccio players
SC Toulon players
FC Spartak Trnava players
Al Ahed FC players
Expatriate footballers in Slovakia
Expatriate footballers in France
Expatriate footballers in Lebanon
Guinean expatriate sportspeople in Slovakia
Guinean expatriate sportspeople in France
Guinean expatriate sportspeople in Lebanon